Paul Rinaldi is a visual artist whose work has been included in numerous exhibitions in the United States, the Middle East, and Europe.  From 1991 through 1998 he lived in Egypt and taught art at the American University in Cairo.  In 1986, Rinaldi was awarded the Silvermine Guild Prize for Painting in the Art of the Northeast USA exhibition juried by Linda Shearer, Curator of Contemporary Art at New York's Museum of Modern Art.  Rinaldi received his MFA degree in 1988 from the City University of New York, Brooklyn College.

External links
 Personal homepage

Artists from Oak Park, Illinois
Artists from New York City
Living people
City University of New York alumni
Year of birth missing (living people)
Brooklyn College alumni